James Walter "Buddy" McGirt (born January 17, 1964) is an American former professional boxer who competed from 1982 to 1997, and has since worked as a boxing trainer. He held world championships in two weight classes, including the IBF junior welterweight title in 1988, and the WBC and lineal welterweight titles from 1991 to 1993.

As a trainer he has worked with multiple world champions, including Arturo Gatti, Antonio Tarver, Hasim Rahman, Paulie Malignaggi, and Sergey Kovalev. McGirt was named Trainer of the Year for 2002 by the Boxing Writers Association of America. He is presently the coach of WBO world champion Zhanibek Alimkhanuly and though Janibek has claimed in Kazakh interviews that he is not fond of McGirt, they have a deep respect for each other.

Professional boxing career

McGirt's aspirations of becoming a professional boxer existed at a young age."They said I was too small," McGirt says now. "They said I couldn't do it. I said I could. I said I'd be the first world champion from Long Island - so the guy they said couldn't do it is the one who did it." Fulfilling this childhood dream, he did so with a vengeance, turning professional in the year 1983, the year he graduated from Brentwood High School.

In 1988, McGirt defeated Frankie Warren, avenging what was at that time his only defeat, to win the IBF light welterweight title. In his second defense, he lost the title to Meldrick Taylor.

In November 1991, he defeated Simon Brown to win the Lineal and WBC welterweight titles.

Buddy was a scrappy, talented fighter who had an outstanding career in the ring. He defeated men such as Simon Brown, Livingstone Bramble, Saoul Mamby, Edwin Curet, Howard Davis, Frankie Warren, Tony Baltazar, Gennaro Leon, Patrizio Oliva, Gary Jacobs, Tommy Ayers, Willie Rodriguez, Ralph Twinning, Buck Smith, Kevin Pompey, Rafael Williams, John Senegal, Eric Martin, Joe Manley, Tyrone Moore, Nick Rupa, Joe Gatti and George Heckley.

At the beginning of 1993, McGirt was the world's top-ranked 147-pound boxer, one of the best pound-for-pound fighters in the world; but in the first week starting off the year he tore up his left shoulder while training. Without his money punch, the left hook, he had to box virtually one-handed for a total of 24 rounds in two championship fights.  He won the first fight, but he lost his title in the second. McGirt lost the title to Pernell Whitaker in 1993. The following year, he again lost to Whitaker in an attempt to regain the title.

In 1997, he retired with a record of 73-6-1 (48 KOs).

McGirt was inducted into the Suffolk Sports Hall of Fame on Long Island in the Boxing Category with the Class of 1992. He was inducted into the New Jersey Boxing Hall of Fame in 1998 and inducted into the International Boxing Hall of Fame in 2019.

Training career
Following his retirement from the ring, McGirt worked as a trainer. His first champion was Byron Mitchell, who he started training six days before beating Manny Siaca for the WBA super middleweight title. McGirt would take up training full-time and became committed to the challenge of preparing other boxers to step into the ring. "Anybody can train but not many people can teach," McGirt said. "And that's what boxing is missing now—teachers. There are not many old-school trainers around." McGirt won the Boxing Writers' Association of America Trainer of the Year Award for 2002.

McGirt's son, James McGirt Jr., is also a professional boxer. McGirt also trained Kurt Pellegrino's boxing, his first venture into MMA, and trained heavyweight boxer Taishan Dong.

Buddy was trained and managed by Al Certo and Stuart Weiner. McGirt, and some of the fighters he trained are documented in the book "Bring it to the Ring: A Boxing Yearbook and Inspirational Message to Today's Youths." The book was published in 2005.

Buddy was interviewed in 2018 by Darren Carter on the "Pocket Party Podcast" that is available on iTunes, YouTube, Stitcher, and Anchor.

McGirt also began training Sergey Kovalev for his rematch against Eleider Alvarez (who knocked out Kovalev in 7th round in the 1st fight) and led him to a Unanimous Decision Win with 116–112 on 2 cards and 120–108 on the 3rd.

Professional boxing record

See also
List of light-welterweight boxing champions
List of welterweight boxing champions
List of WBC world champions
Notable boxing families

References

External links

 

1964 births
Boxers from New York (state)
People from Brentwood, New York
American boxing trainers
Brentwood High School (Brentwood, New York) alumni
International Boxing Federation champions
Living people
World Boxing Council champions
American male boxers
Light-middleweight boxers
World light-welterweight boxing champions
World welterweight boxing champions
International Boxing Hall of Fame inductees